Regenerative Medicine Advanced Therapy (RMAT) is a designation given by the Food and Drug Administration to drug candidates intended to treat serious or life-threatening conditions under the 21st Century Cures Act. A RMAT designation allows for accelerated approval based surrogate or intermediate endpoints.

RMAT goes beyond breakthrough therapy features by allowing for accelerated approval of drugs based on surrogate endpoints. A surrogate endpoint is a biomarker that substitutes for a direct endpoint, such as clinical benefit.

Legal background 
Section 3033 of the 21st Century Cures Act introduces section 506(g) of the Federal Food, Drug, and Cosmetic Act (FD&C Act) that allows for the designation of certain therapies as a 'regenerative medicine advanced therapy' (RMAT).

Qualifying criteria 
In order to qualify for RMAT status, a treatment must

 meet the definition of a regenerative medicine therapy,
 intend to treat, modify, reverse or cure a serious condition, and
 be supported by preliminary clinical evidence that indicates the RMAT candidate can address the clinical need.

A regenerative medicine therapy is defined in section 506(g)(8) of the FD&C Act to include cell therapies, therapeutic tissue engineering, human cell and tissue products. Under the FDA's interpretation, gene therapies and genetically modified cells that have a lasting effect, such as CAR-T antitumor therapies, may also qualify as regenerative medicine therapies.

Effect 
A RMAT designation includes all benefits of the Fast Track and breakthrough therapy designations. In addition, it opens up early interactions between the FDA and sponsors to facilitate accelerated approval. In this context, accelerated approval means approval based on

 previously agreed-upon surrogate or intermediate endpoints, or
 data from a limited but meaningful number of sites.

The ability to use 'Real World Evidence' (RWE), i.e. post-market evidence of safety and effectiveness, is particularly useful in the context of orphan diseases, where recruiting a sufficiently large cohort for pre-marketing clinical trials may not be feasible. RWE may include data from patient registries, clinical records and case studies.

Where a RMAT's sponsor fails to comply with the requirements for accelerated approval, the RMAT designation and the benefits conferred by it can be withdrawn.

Examples

Statistics 
In 2020, the FDA received 34 requests for RMAT status, of which 12 (35.3%) were granted. RMAT designated drugs include the novel CAR-T therapy Kymriah and betibeglogene autotemcel for beta thalassemia. As of 31 March 2021, 62 requests for RMAT status have been granted.

More than half of the RMAT applications received by March 2019 involved autologous or allogeneic cell therapy products, including CAR-T therapies.

See also 

 Breakthrough therapy
 Advanced Therapy Medicinal Product (European Medicines Agency equivalent)
Sakigake (Japanese equivalent)
 Orphan drug

References 

Breakthrough therapy
Pharmacy
Pharmaceuticals policy
Food and Drug Administration